A lineage in Buddhism is a line of transmission of the Buddhist teaching that is "theoretically traced back to the Buddha himself." The acknowledgement of the transmission can be oral, or certified in documents. Several branches of Buddhism, including Chan (including Zen and Seon) and Tibetan Buddhism maintain records of their historical teachers. These records serve as a validation for the living exponents of the tradition.

The historical authenticity of various Buddhist lineages has been subject to debate. Stephen Batchelor has claimed, speaking about specifically Japanese Zen lineage, "the historicity of this “lineage” simply does not withstand critical scrutiny." Erik Storlie has noted that transmission "is simply false on historical grounds." Edward Conze said "much of the traditions about the early history of Chan are the inventions of a later age."

Vinaya
In the lineage of the vinaya, the requirements for ordination as a bhikkhu ("monk") or a bhikkhuni ("nun") include the presence of at least five other monks, one of whom must be a fully ordained preceptor, and another an acharya (teacher). This lineage for ordaining bhikshunis became extinct in the Theravada school and in Tibetan Buddhism. Therefore, when śrāmaṇerikās like Tenzin Palmo wanted full ordination, she had to travel to Hong Kong.

Mahasiddha
Lineages in the Mahasiddha tradition do not necessarily originate from Gautama Buddha, but are ultimately grounded, like all Buddhist lineages, in the Adi-Buddha.

Chan and Zen lineages

Construction of lineages
The idea of a patriarchal lineage in Chan Buddhism dates back to the epitaph for Fărú (法如 638–689), a disciple of the 5th patriarch, Hóngrĕn (弘忍 601–674). In the Long Scroll of the Treatise on the Two Entrances and Four Practices and the Continued Biographies of Eminent Monks, Daoyu and Huike are the only explicitly identified disciples of Bodhidharma. The epitaph gives a line of descent identifying Bodhidharma as the first patriarch.

In the 6th century biographies of famous monks were collected. From this genre the typical Chan-lineage was developed:

D. T. Suzuki contends that Chan's growth in popularity during the 7th and 8th centuries attracted criticism that it had "no authorized records of its direct transmission from the founder of Buddhism" and that Chan historians made Bodhidharma the 28th patriarch of Buddhism in response to such attacks.

Six patriarchs
The earliest lineages described the lineage from Bodhidharma to Huineng. There is no generally accepted 7th Chinese Patriarch.

The principle teachers of the Chan, Zen and Seon traditions are commonly known in English translations as "Patriarchs". However, the more precise terminology would be "Ancestors" or "Founders" and "Ancestral Masters" or "Founding Masters", as the commonly used Chinese terms are gender neutral. Various records of different authors are known, which give a variation of transmission lines:

Continuous lineage from Gautama Buddha
Eventually these descriptions of the lineage evolved into a continuous lineage from Gautama Buddha to Bodhidharma. The idea of a line of descent from Gautama is the basis for the distinctive lineage tradition of Chan.

According to the Song of Enlightenment (證道歌 Zhèngdào gē) by Yǒngjiā Xuánjué (665-713), one of the chief disciples of Huineng, Bodhidharma was the 28th Patriarch of Buddhism in a line of descent from Gautama Buddha through his disciple Mahākāśyapa:

The Denkoroku gives 28 patriarchs in this transmission, and 53 overall:

Transmission to Japan
Twenty-four different Zen lineages are recorded to be transmitted to Japan. Only three survived until today. Sōtō was transmitted to Japan by Dōgen, who travelled to China for Chan training in the 13th century. After receiving Dharma transmission in the Caodong school, he returned to Japan and established the lineage there, where it is called the Sōtō.

The Linji school was also transmitted to Japan several times, where it is the Rinzai school.

Jōdo Shinshū
In Jōdo Shinshū, "Patriarch" refers to seven Indian, Chinese and Japanese masters before its founder, Shinran.

Tibetan Buddhism
The 14th Dalai Lama, in the foreword to Karmapa: The Sacred Prophecy states:Within the context of Tibetan Buddhism, the importance of lineage extends far beyond the ordinary sense of a particular line of inheritance or descent. Lineage is a sacred trust through which the integrity of Buddha's teachings is preserved intact as it is transmitted from one generation to the next. The vital link through which the spiritual tradition is nourished and maintained is the profound connection between an enlightened master and perfectly devoted disciple. The master-disciple relationship is considered extremely sacred by all the major schools of Tibetan Buddhism.

Karma Kagyu

Possession of lineage
Wallace renders into English a citation of Karma Chagme (fl. 17th century) that contains an embedded quotation attributed to Nāropā (956-1041 CE):

Preservation of lineages
Gyatrul (b. 1924), in a purport to Karma Chagme, conveys Dilgo Khyentse's 'samaya', diligence and humility in receiving Vajrayana empowerment, lineal Dharma transmission and rlung, as rendered into English by Wallace (Chagmé et al., 1998: p. 21):

Chöd
Chöd is an advanced spiritual practice known as "Cutting Through the Ego." This practice, based on the Prajnaparamita sutra, uses specific meditations and tantric ritual.

There are several hagiographic accounts of how chöd came to Tibet.  One namtar (hagiography) asserts that shortly after Kamalaśīla won his famous debate with Moheyan as to whether Tibet should adopt the "sudden" route to enlightenment or his own "gradual" route, Kamalaśīla enacted phowa,  transferring his mindstream to animate a corpse polluted with contagion in order to safely move the hazard it presented.  As the mindstream of Kamalaśīla was otherwise engaged, a mahasiddha named Dampa Sangye came across the vacant kuten or "physical basis" of Kamalaśīla. Dampa Sangye was not karmically blessed with an aesthetic corporeal form, and upon finding the very handsome and healthy empty body of Kamalaśīla, which he assumed to be a newly dead fresh corpse, used phowa to transfer his own mindstream into Kamalaśīla's body. Dampa Sangye's mindstream in Kamalaśīla's body continued the ascent to the Himalaya and thereby transmitted the Pacification of Suffering teachings and the Indian form of Chöd which contributed to the Mahamudra Chöd of Machig Labdrön. The mindstream of Kamalaśīla was unable to return to his own kuten and so was forced to enter the vacant body of Dampa Sangye.

See also 
Dharma transmission
Gotra
Religious order
Sangharaja
Zen lineage charts

Notes

References

Sources

External links
The Lineages and History of Buddhism
Chö/Chöd/Lineages associated with Machig Labdrön
Schools of Zen Buddhism at the Zen Buddhism WWW Virtual Library
Zen Ancestors in China - The Five Houses
Caodong and Linji lineage chart of present-day Chan Master Sheng-yen
 Buddhist masters

Buddhist philosophical concepts
Buddhist orders